Kai Sauer (born 3 March 1967, Hamburg,  West Germany) is a Finnish diplomat. He is the current Under-Secretary of State, Foreign and Security Policy, in the Ministry for Foreign Affairs of Finland.

Early life and education 
Ambassador Sauer was born in Hamburg, West Germany to a German father and a Finnish mother in 1967. In 1995, Sauer graduated from the University of Tampere with a master's degree in Social Sciences majoring in International Relations. He has also studied in Freie Universität Berlin and Hamburg University.

In 2014, the University of Tampere awarded Ambassador Sauer as Alumni of the Year.

Career 
Ambassador Sauer began his diplomatic career with the Finnish Foreign Ministry in 1995 working as a Desk Officer for Germany, Austria, Switzerland, United States and Canada in the Political Department.

In 1997, Sauer transferred to the Economic Department to work as a Desk Officer for Cooperation with Adjacent Areas. In 1998, he worked for the Department for Press and Culture as the Desk Officer for Cultural Cooperation.

1998–2000 Sauer served as the Deputy Head of the Embassy of Finland in Zagreb, Croatia.

2000–2003 Sauer worked as the First Secretary of the Permanent Mission of Finland to the United Nations.

2003–2004 Sauer served as a Senior Adviser to the Special Representative of the Secretary General, Mr. Harri Holkeri in the United Nations Interim Administration Mission in Kosovo (UNMIK). 2004–2005 Sauer worked as the Head of the Strategic Analysis and Research Unit in UNMIK.

In 2005, Sauer was appointed as the Director of the Unit for the Western Balkans, in the Ministry for Foreign Affairs of Finland.

2005–2007 Sauer worked as a Senior Adviser to the Special Representative of the UN Secretary General, former President of the Republic of Finland, Martti Ahtisaari who led the UN-facilitated Kosovo future status process and the UN Office of the Special Envoy for Kosovo (UNOSEK) in Vienna, Austria.

2007–2010 Sauer worked as the Director of the Unit for UN Affairs in the Ministry for Foreign Affairs.

In 2010 Sauer was appointed as the Ambassador of Finland to Indonesia, Timor-Leste and ASEAN (Association of Southeast Asian Nations).

2014–2019, Sauer served as the Permanent Representative of Finland to the United Nations.

In 2019, Sauer started in the position of Under-Secretary of State for Political and Security Affairs, Ministry for Foreign Affairs, Finland

Personal life 
Ambassador Sauer is married to Dr. Erika Sauer with whom he has two adult daughters.

He is an active ice hockey player, scuba diver and runner. Sauer has run several marathons. While serving as the Finnish Ambassador to Indonesia, Sauer won the unofficial ice hockey championship of Indonesia in 2013.

After moving to New York, Ambassador Sauer together with the Permanent Representative of Liechtenstein, Ambassador Christian Wenaweser, founded a running club for the UN ambassadors. In December 2018, the PR runners were featured in the New York Times.

Honors 
Commander, Order of the Lion of Finland (2019)
Knight, First Class, Order of the Lion of Finland (2007)
 National Defence Course 183 (2007) 
 Alumni of the Year, University of Tampere (2014)
 Doctor of Humane Letters (h.c.), Northland College, Wisconsin, USA (2019)
Military rank: Corporal

References 

Permanent Representatives of Finland to the United Nations
Knights First Class of the Order of the Lion of Finland
1967 births
Living people
Finnish people of German descent
University of Tampere alumni